Deividas Margevičius (born 26 April 1995) is a Lithuanian butterfly swimmer. In 2016 he won the national 100 m, setting a new national record at 53.53. With the best national season time (53.12) he was selected to represent Lithuania in 2016 Summer Olympics in the 4 × 100 m medley relay.

In 2019, he competed at the 2019 World Aquatics Championships held in Gwangju, South Korea.

On 20 September 2022 Margevičius announced about his retirement from professional sport.

References

External links

 
 
 
 
 

1995 births
Living people
Lithuanian male butterfly swimmers
Olympic swimmers of Lithuania
Swimmers at the 2016 Summer Olympics
Swimmers at the 2020 Summer Olympics